Route 98 is a   southwest-northeast numbered highway in central Massachusetts. The highways southern terminus is a continuation of Rhode Island Route 98 in Uxbridge and the northern terminus is at Route 146A in Uxbridge.

Route description
The route passes through Aldrich Village, crossing the Douglas Pike and passing a number of buildings on the National Historic Register.  One of the historic buildings is the Friends Meetinghouse which is at the northern terminus of Route 98. Nationally prominent Abolitionists Abby Kelley Foster and Effingham Capron were members here. The Southern New England Trunkline Trail crosses Route 98 a short distance south of the Quaker Meeting house and the junction with Route 146A. 
 
Route 98 passes under Route 146 without junction shortly before its northern end at Route 146A, between Exits 1 and 2 of Route 146.  The entire route in Massachusetts takes only 3.87 miles (6.23 km).

Major intersections

See also
List of Registered Historic Places in Uxbridge, Massachusetts

References

External links

Uxbridge, Massachusetts
098
Transportation in Worcester County, Massachusetts